Kurbulik (Khürbelig) is a rural locality (a settlement) in Barguzinsky District, Republic of Buryatia, Russia. The population was 101 as of 2010. There are 3 streets.

Geography 
Kurbulik is located 93 km west of Barguzin (the district's administrative centre) by road. Katun is the nearest rural locality.

References 

Rural localities in Barguzinsky District
Populated places on Lake Baikal